Siwalkhas Assembly constituency is one of the 403 constituencies of the Uttar Pradesh Legislative Assembly, India. It is a part of the Meerut district and one of the five assembly constituencies in the Baghpat Lok Sabha constituency. First election in this assembly constituency was held in 1974 after the "Delimitation Order, 1967" was passed and the constituency was constituted in 1967. The constituency is assigned identification number 43 subsequent to the "Delimitation of Parliamentary and Assembly Constituencies Order, 2008".

Wards / Areas
Extent of Siwalkhas Assembly constituency is KCs Rohta, Jani Khurd, Siwalkhas NP of Meerut Tehsil; KC Saroorpur & Karnawal NP of Sardhana Tehsil.

Members of the Legislative Assembly

Election results

2022

2017

2012

See also
Baghpat Lok Sabha constituency
Meerut district
Sixteenth Legislative Assembly of Uttar Pradesh
Uttar Pradesh Legislative Assembly

References

External links
 

Assembly constituencies of Uttar Pradesh
Politics of Meerut district
Constituencies established in 1967
1967 establishments in Uttar Pradesh